Mason County Schools may refer to:
Mason County Schools (Kentucky)
Mason County Schools (West Virginia)